Văcărești is a commune in Dâmbovița County, Muntenia, Romania. It is composed of three villages: Bungetu, Brăteștii de Jos and Văcărești. Until 2004, it also included Perșinari village, split off that year to form a separate commune.

References

Communes in Dâmbovița County
Localities in Muntenia